Siphanta acuta is a species of planthopper in the family Flatidae; this species is native to Australia, but is now found in various other parts of the world. About 10 mm long, they resemble small leaves and are generally found in trees.

References

External links 

 Siphanta acuta at Factsheets: Interesting Insects and other Invertebrates

Hemiptera of New Zealand
Hemiptera of Australia
Insects described in 1851
Flatidae